KMD may refer to:

 KMD, Kausing Much Damage
 KMD Brands, New Zealand based retailer
 KMD (company), formerly Kommunedata
 Kirchenmusikdirektor, abbreviated in German to the title KMD, director of church music